A minor is a minor scale based on A, with the pitches A, B, C, D, E, F, and G. Its key signature has no flats and no sharps. Its relative major is C major and its parallel major is A major.

The A natural minor scale is:

Changes needed for the melodic and harmonic versions of the scale are written in with accidentals as necessary. The A harmonic minor and melodic minor scales are:

Well-known compositions in A minor 

Johann Sebastian Bach
Violin Concerto in A minor, BWV 1041
Ludwig van Beethoven
Violin Sonata No. 4, Op. 23
String Quartet No. 15, Op. 132
Bagatelle in A minor, "Für Elise"
Johannes Brahms
Double Concerto, Op. 102
Frédéric Chopin
Étude Op. 10, No. 2
Étude Op. 25, No. 4
Étude Op. 25, No. 11, Winter Wind
Mazurka Op. 17, No. 4
Mazurka Op. 59, No. 1
Boléro,  Op. 19
Prelude No. 2 in A minor, Op. 28/2
Waltz in A minor, Op. 34, B. 150
Franz Liszt
Transcendental Étude No. 2, Fusées
Edvard Grieg
Piano Concerto, Op. 16
Johann Nepomuk Hummel
Piano Concerto No. 2, Op. 85
Gustav Mahler
Symphony No. 6
Piano Quartet
Felix Mendelssohn
Symphony No. 3, Scottish
Wolfgang Amadeus Mozart
Piano Sonata No. 8, K. 310
Camille Saint-Saëns
Introduction and Rondo Capriccioso, Op. 28
Cello Concerto No. 1, Op. 33
Franz Schubert
Piano Sonata, D 537
Piano Sonata, D 784
String Quartet No. 13, D 804 Rosamunde
Piano Sonata, D 845
Arpeggione Sonata, D. 821
Clara Schumann
Piano Concerto, Op. 7
Robert Schumann
Violin Sonata No. 1, Op. 105
Piano Concerto, Op. 54
Cello Concerto, Op. 129
Niccolò Paganini
Caprice No. 24
Jean Sibelius
Symphony No. 4, Op. 63
Ralph Vaughan Williams
Oboe Concerto
Dmitri Shostakovich
Violin Concerto No. 1, Op. 99

External links

Musical keys
Minor scales